Mary Fletcher was the namesake of the largest hospital in Vermont, formerly named "Fletcher Allen Health Care". An invalid who suffered from tuberculosis for the majority of her lifetime, she was from a philanthropic family who also are the namesake of the Fletcher Free Library (which is also in Burlington, Vermont).

References

American women philanthropists
People from Burlington, Vermont
Philanthropists from Vermont